Cristina Olea (born 1982) is a Spanish journalist.

Biography
Olea did her initial training at the University of Santiago de Compostela where she graduated in Journalism in 2004, she also took a Master's degree in Television Journalism from the RTVE Institute and the Diploma of Advanced Studies (DEA) in Humanities from the Autonomous University of Barcelona.

Since 2006 she has worked for Televisión Española as a parliamentary reporter and later in the international section. She has been a special envoy to various countries around the world, she covered the United States elections in 2012 when Obama was elected and the conclave in 2013 when Jorge Mario Bergoglio was elected the new Pope of the Catholic Church adopting the name of Francis.

Since 2018 she has been a correspondent for Televisión Española in Washington D. C. (United States). In January 2021 she interviewed former US President Barack Obama for the program Informe Semanal.

Awards
 2013
Golden Globe in the World Media Festival (Hamburg) for her report The disenchantment of Europe for the news program En Portada.
 2013
Grand Prize of the Jury of the World Media Festival (Hamburg) with El desencanto de Europa, report for the program En Portada.

References

1982 births
Spanish journalists
Spanish women journalists
Living people
People from Vigo
University of Santiago de Compostela alumni